China Road and Bridge Corporation (CRBC), a subsidiary of Fortune Global 500 company China Communications Construction Company (CCCC), focuses on global civil engineering and construction projects such as highways, railways, bridges, ports, and tunnels. Growing out of the Foreign Aid Office of the Ministry of Communications of China, CRBC and its predecessors have been executing projects since 1958. In 1979, CRBC was formally established and entered the international contracting market. The parent entity, CCCC, was formed through the combination of CRBC and China Harbour Engineering Company Ltd (CHEC) in 2005.

CRBC is among the largest engineering and construction firms globally, and operates from more than 50 branches and offices throughout Asia, Africa, Europe and the Americas. CRBC has played a key role in the design and construction of both greenfield and brownfield infrastructure projects in developing countries, especially those located in Africa where it is a market leader. The company has full EPC capabilities, and actively pursues P3 projects, often acting as concessionaire. The company's motto is: "Build roads and bridges, make contributions to society, put employees first, and strive for excellence."

In addition to the design and construction of infrastructure, CRBC is engaged in infrastructure equity investment; real estate development and management; and industrial park equity investment and development.

Notable bridge projects 

Pelješac Bridge (Croatia), a US$340m project; the first time that a Chinese company has won the bid for a project funded by the European Union
Danyang–Kunshan Grand Bridge, considered the longest bridge in the world
 Hong Kong–Zhuhai–Macau Bridge (connects Hong Kong with Macau and Zhuhai), which is among the longest fixed-links in the world
 Pupin Bridge (Serbia), the second bridge constructed over the Danube in Belgrade
 Sutong Yangtze River Bridge (China), which had the longest main span of any cable-stayed bridge in the world between 2008 and 2012, is currently listed as one of the tallest bridges, and won an Outstanding Civil Engineering Achievement (OCEA) award from the American Society of Civil Engineers
 Suramadu Bridge (Indonesia), the longest bridge in Indonesia and the first bridge to cross the Madura Strait
 Tayan Bridge (Indonesia), the longest bridge in Borneo
 Cao Lãnh Bridge (Vietnam)
 Xiamen Haicang Bridge in Fujian Province (China), which is on the list of longest suspension bridge spans
 Donghai Bridge (China), the first sea-crossing bridge completed in China and one of the longest cross-sea bridges in the world
 Hangzhou Bay Bridge (China), which is among the ten longest trans-oceanic bridges
 Runyang Yangtze River Bridge (China), the third longest suspension bridge span in the world and the largest in China, 
 Jintang Bridge (China), the third longest cross-sea bridge built in China
 Booué of Ogooué Bridge (Gabon)
 Foundiougne Bridge (Senegal)
 Cunene River Bridge (Angola), the longest bridge in Angola
 Maputo–Katembe bridge
 Qin Dwin River Bridge (Myanmar)
 Bubiyan Bridge (Kuwait)
 Cross Bay Link, Tseung Kwan O, Hong Kong (under construction)
 Binondo–Intramuros Bridge (Philippines)
 Estrella–Pantaleon Bridge (Philippines)
 NLEX Connector Section 2 (Philippines, under construction)
 Davao-Samal Bridge (Philippines)

Notable tunnel projects 

 Erlangshan Tunnel on Sichuan-Tibet Highway (China), one of the world's longest tunnels
 Shakhristan Tunnel of the Tajikistan-Uzbekistan Highway (Tajikistan), the longest tunnel in Tajikistan
 Karnaphuli Tunnel (Bangladesh)
 Datong-Yuncheng Expressway Yanmenguan Tunnel (China)
 Zun-Chong Expressway Qingshaogang Tunnel (China)

Notable road projects 

 Beijing Capital Airport Expressway (China)
 Brazzaville Viaduct Project (Congo-Brazzaville), the first viaduct in Congo-Brazzaville and the longest bridge in west and central Africa
 Shanghai-Nanjing Expressway (China)
 Addis Ababa to Nazret Expressway (Ethiopia)
 Addis Ababa Ring Road Project (Ethiopia)
 Datong–Yuncheng Expressway (China), the largest expressway structure in China's Shanxi province
 Thies-Touba Toll Highway (Senegal) 
 Phnom Peng - Sihanoukville Expressway Project (Cambodia), a $1.7 billion project that includes 89 bridges
 National Road No. 7 Improvement Project in Xieng Khouang Province (Laos)
 Pifo-Papallacta Road Project (Ecuador)
 Los Granados Overpass Project of Quito City (Ecuador)
 Kigali Urban Road Upgrading Project (Rwanda) - with this project, CRBC has built 70% of Rwanda's asphalt roads
 Osh-Wootz Road Rehabilitation Project (Kyrgyzstan)
 Rehabilitation of the Caxito to N'zeto Road (Angola)
 Smokovac-Uvač-Mateševo section of the Bar-Boljare Motorway (Montenegro), which has 19 bridges, 16 tunnels, and 3 interchanges
 Pakistan Karakoram Highway Upgrading Project (Pakistan), one of the highest paved roads in the world
 Dare-e-Sof and Yakawlang Road (Afghanistan), a 550 km road over mountainous terrain requiring eight large bridges as well as 194 small bridges
 Rehabilitation and Modernization of the Alfao-Sanvé Condji-Bénin Border Road (Togo)
 Odienne-Gbelegban Highway Project (Côte d'Ivoire)
 Thies-Touba Toll Highway Project (Senegal)
 Madagascar Capital Airport Road Project (Madagascar)
 Phnom Penh-Sihanoukville expressway (Cambodia)

Notable rail projects 

 Beijing-Shanghai High Speed Railway (China), the world's longest high-speed rail ever constructed in a single phase
 Mombasa-Nairobi Standard Gauge Railway (Kenya), the largest infrastructure project constructed in Kenya since independence; received an Award of Merit from Engineering News Record (ENR)
 Nairobi-Naivasha Standard Gauge Railway (Kenya)
 Yongzhou-Liuzhou Section Expansion Project of Hunan-Guangxi High-Speed Railway (China)
 Harbin-Dalian Passenger Dedicated Line (China)
 Datong-Xi’an Railway Passenger-Dedicated Stations Section 14 (China)
 Nanjing–Anqing Railway Section 5 (China)
 2 Section of Chengdu-Kunming High-Speed Railway (China)
 Hefei-Guangzhou High Speed Rail (China)
 Haergai Station to Muli Coal Mine, Qinghai-Tibet Plateau (China)

Notable port, airport and other projects 

 Beijing Capital International Airport Terminal 3 (China), the second largest airport terminal in the world and the ninth largest building in the world by area
 Section IV of the 3RS Project at Hong Kong International Airport
 Bata Port Project (Equatorial Guinea), the first large modern port in Central Africa
 Saint Mary Road Port Project (Madagascar)
 OYO Inland Wharf Project (Congo-Brazzaville)
 Friendship Port of Nouakchott (Mauritania)
 No. 19 Berth in Mombasa (Kenya), the first port project of Kenya since 1984
 Cabinda University (Angola)
 Zaire Province Hospital Project (Angola)
 Kampar Sports Complex (Malaysia)
 Teacher Training Institute (Malaysia)
 Yachay University Real Estate Project (Ecuador)

References

External links
Corporate website

Government-owned companies of China
Construction and civil engineering companies of China
Chinese companies established in 1979
Construction and civil engineering companies established in 1979
1979 establishments in China